Robert Watson, Bob Watson, or Bobby Watson may refer to:

Politics
 Robert Spence Watson (1837–1911), English solicitor, reformer, politician and writer
 Robert James Watson (1846–1931), Canadian parliamentarian
 Robert Watson (Canadian politician) (1853–1929), Canadian parliamentarian
 Robert Watson (Newfoundland politician) (1863–1906)
 Bob Watson (Australian politician) (1896–1959), member of the Queensland Legislative Assembly
 Robert Watson Pomeroy (1902–1989), American businessman and politician
 Robert A. Watson (born 1960), Rhode Island politician
 Robert P. Watson (born 1962), American political commentator, former candidate in Florida

Science
 Robert Watson (engineer) (1822–1891), English and Australian civil engineer, surveyor, railway engineer
 Robert Boog Watson (1823–1910), Scottish malacologist
 Sir Robert Watson (chemist) (born 1948), British chemist and atmosphere scientist
 Robert Watson (computer scientist) (born 1977), British FreeBSD developer

Sports
 Robert Watson (footballer) (1866 – after 1889), English footballer for Everton
 Robert B. Watson (1913–1997), Canadian Hall of Fame jockey
 Bobby Watson (basketball player) (1930–2017), American basketball player
 Bobby Watson (basketball coach) (1942–1977), American basketball coach
 Bob Watson (1946–2020), American sports executive and pro baseball player
 Bobby Watson (footballer) (born 1946), Scottish football player and manager
 Bob Watson (lacrosse) (born 1970), Canadian lacrosse goaltender

Other people
 Robert Watson (historian) (1730–1781), Scottish professor and historian
 Robert Watson (harbourmaster) (1756–1819), British sailor, settler in Sydney, New South Wales, Australia
 Bobby Watson (actor) (1888–1965), American actor
 Robert Watson (artist) (1923–2004), American landscape painter
 Robert W. Watson (1925–2012), English and creative writing professor at UNC Greensboro
 Bobby Watson (born 1953), American jazz saxophonist
 Robert K. Watson (born 1961), American businessman, pioneer of green building
 Robert Watson (Scrabble player), American National Scrabble Championship winner, 1988

See also  
 Rob Watson (disambiguation)
 Robert Watson-Watt (1892–1973), Scottish radar pioneer